The Knox County Courthouse is a historic building located on High Street in Mount Vernon, Ohio, United States. It was built in 1855 in the Greek Revival style of architecture. It was listed on the National Register of Historic Places in 1973.

References

External links

Government buildings completed in 1855
County courthouses in Ohio
Greek Revival architecture in Ohio
Buildings and structures in Knox County, Ohio
National Register of Historic Places in Knox County, Ohio
Courthouses on the National Register of Historic Places in Ohio
Clock towers in Ohio